Princess Kandarapa was a princess of the Kingdom of Tondo during the Spanish conquest of the Philippines. She was described as a niece of Bunao Lakan Dula, king of Tondo, as she was a daughter of Bunao Lakan Dula's sister, princess Salanta, who became a widow at a young age. She was named after the Kandarapa bird, a lark that frequently stayed amongst the rice padies, who's songs she imitated with her beautiful voice. Her uncle resisted conversion to Islam and remained in the Hindu-Malay religion of his forebears and although Tondo was an older kingdom, it ceded power to Manila which was established as a satellite state subservient to the Sultanate of Brunei after a Bruneian invasion of Luzon. Lakan Dula, desirous of forging an alliance with the much more powerful Rajah of Macabebe, Tariq Suleiman, betrothed her niece to the Rajah of Macabebe, an arrangement Princess Kandarapa disapproved because he already had multiple wives from previous marriages as a result of his Islamic religion.

Soon however, the balance of power between the state of Manila and the kingdom of Tondo came to a change with the arrival of the Spaniards, that had sailed from Mexico, who were firmly against Muslim interests as Christian Spain had freshly finished the Reconquista in the homeland, expelling the Arabic speaking denizens of the Emirate of Granada upon their invasion of that Muslim Spanish kingdom.

It was in this context, was when Kandarapa was bathing in the Pasig River with a retinue of her servant-maidens was when she encountered the Mexico-born Spanish Conquistador Juan de Salcedo. While the rest of her entourage fled in fear of the man, she froze there staring at the erswhile Mexican, while the conquistador, in kind, stood there too, "appreciating' her feminine figure who by the color of her goldenbrown skin hinted at admixture present in her asides from the native Malay (North Indian, due to the Hindu religion of Tondo and East Asian due to trading links with the Far East), after briefly beholding her, he politely excused himself to do an errand.

Romance with Conquistador Juan de Salcedo 

Local folk legends and a written account by Don Felipe Cepeda, Salcedo's aide, who returned to Acapulco, recount that after the Spanish conquest of Luzon with Mexican and Visayan assistance, and their consequent takeover of the Pasig River delta polity of Hindu Tondo, which was the previous preeminent state in Luzon before the Brunei Sultanate established their puppet-kingdom, Islamic Manila, to supplant Tondo, Juan de Salcedo, then about 22 years old, fell in love with the 18-year-old Dayang-dayang ("Princess") Kandarapa, so named after the lark of the rice fields, who's song she imitated by her beautiful singing voice, was said to be the niece of Lakandula, Tondo's Lakan ("Paramount ruler"). Juan fell in love, upon seeing the femininity of her figure while she and her handmaidens were bathing in the Pasig River. Their love was completely against their forebears' wishes since Lakan Dula wanted his niece, Dayang-dayang Kandarapa, to be married to the Rajah of Macabebe which Kandarapa didn't want as he was already married multiple times to other women due to his Islamic custom; and Miguel Lopez de Legaspi wanted his Mexican grandson, Salcedo, to marry a pure Spanish woman. The Rajah of Macabebe who got word of the budding romance from Rajah Soliman a fellow Muslim Rajah, of Manila, became enraged and he cried out:

Tariq Suleyman then waged the Battle of Bangkusay against the Spaniards, to counter-act which, Miguel Lopez de Legaspi dispatched Martin de Goiti and Juan de Salcedo to the battlefield where they slayed Tariq Suleyman through a cannon shot to the chest, thereby falling overboard to be eaten by the crocodiles he swore by. The Spanish were afterward overloaded with loot and prisoners. Among the detainees were Lakandola's son and nephew, whom Legaspi freed while concealing his knowledge of the rajahs of Tondo's betrayal. De Goite sailed into Bulakan through the twisting channels of the Pampanga, bringing Lakandola and Raja Soliman with them to urge the inhabitants to submit. Legaspi imprisoned Lakandola after he returned to Tondo without authorization despite his eloquence in persuading the other datus to join the Spaniards. When de Goiti and Salcedo returned, of course, Salcedo petitioned for Lakandola's freedom, and he was released.

Afterwards Juan and Kandarapa secretly married, Juan and Kandarapa exchanged letters and rings, hoping that the future will resolve their problems and offer them happiness. Fray Alvarado quickly catechized and baptized Kandarapa, along with many other members of Lakandula's family, and gave Kandarapa the Christian name Dolores. Kandarapa sent Salcedo a message within a cluster of white Lotus flowers (The Lotus flower is the most sacred flower in Tantric Mysticism since it is pure and beautiful despite growing from the mud of its surroundings. It is simultaneously a chief symbol of the Hindu God Vishnu and associated with Zen Buddhism as well.). However, princess Kandarapa mistakenly thought that Salcedo had been unfaithful to her as a result of the dissaproving Miguel de Legaspi sending his grandson on far flung expeditions to deter his love for Kandarapa, and even lying that his grandson married the daughter of the Rajah of Kaog, Santa Lucia. So, she died of a broken heart. Upon going back from his campaigns, Salcedo learned of her death and yet kept her token of fidelity with him until the end. It is said that when he died in Ilocos, he had in his breast pocket, the dried leaves of the Lotus flowers Kandarapa gave him. This romance, as recorded by Don Felipe Cepeda in Mexico, was picked up by the Catalonian Jesuit, Rev. Fr. Jose Ibañez, who published this romance in Spain.

See also 
History of the Philippines

References

History of the Philippines
Filipino royalty
History of the Philippines (900–1565)